Charles David Barker (22 September 1935 – 7 October 2018) was a British equestrian. He competed in the team jumping event at the 1960 Summer Olympics. His cousin is David B. Barker.

References

External links
 

1935 births
2018 deaths
British male equestrians
Olympic equestrians of Great Britain
Equestrians at the 1960 Summer Olympics
Sportspeople from Yorkshire